Tavake Lecanus Liukanasi Manu (born 15 August 1988) is a New Zealand rugby union player. He plays in the number 8 and occasionally flanker position for Mitre 10 Cup side, Otago. Manu also represents Tonga at international level.

Playing career

School boy rugby
While at Christchurch Boys' High School, Manu appeared alongside All Blacks Matt Todd, Colin Slade and Owen Franks as well as former Crusader Tim Bateman.

Provincial Rugby

Manu made his debut for Canterbury in the 2007 Air New Zealand Cup scoring a try on his debut against Counties Manukau at Mt. Smart Stadium in Auckland.

After missing the start of the 2010 ITM Cup with a knee injury, Manu was in excellent form through the latter part of the season, culminating in strong performances in the semi-final and final as Canterbury won the ITM Cup.

In the 2011 ITM Cup, Manu started every match as Canterbury won the title for the fourth consecutive season.
From 2020 Mitre 10 Cup season, he named for Otago squad.

Super Rugby

Manu earned a Crusaders contract for the 2008 Super 14 season at the age of just 19, and emerged as a regular performer for the club, making 12 appearances and two starts as the Crusaders rampaged to the Super 14 title.

In 2009, however, Manu was unable to build on the success of his freshman campaign, and was limited to only four appearances and one start.

Looking for more playing time, Manu shifted to the Highlanders for the 2010 Super 14 season. However, his season ended up being a total write-off as, after winning the starting job at number 8 in the preseason, he suffered a knee injury early in the season-opening contest against the Crusaders and was ruled out for the remainder of the competition.

In 2011, Manu managed to stay healthy and put in an excellent campaign, starting every match at number eight for the Highlanders.

Manu suffered a foot injury in the opening game of the 2013 Super Rugby season and was ruled out for the rest of the year. Healthy again for 2014, he was named co-captain of the Highlanders alongside Ben Smith.

European Rugby
After the experience with Edinburgh Rugby, from 2017 to 2020 he played with Benetton.

International Play
Manu was a member of New Zealand's squad on their run to the world under-19 title in 2007 and under-20 title in 2008. He also was part of the New Zealand Secondary Schools in 2005 and 2006.

Personal
Manu is the nephew of the former Auckland and Wallaby loose forward Daniel Manu and is the cousin of David Manu and Sika Manu of the Melbourne Storm. His younger brother Vaka Manu had a 1-year stint with rugby in Scotland playing for the Stirling County Rugby Club in 2015–16. And second youngest brother Taniela Manu currently plays in the Mitre 10 cup for Northland.

Achievements
2007 Canterbury Junior Sports Person of the Year, Hadlee Awards

Canterbury
•Air New Zealand/ITM Cup: 2008, 2009, 2010, 2011, 2012, 2013

Crusaders
•Super Rugby: 2008

Highlanders
•Super Rugby: 2015

References

External links
 
 Nasi Manu at Mobile Gaming Arcade

1988 births
New Zealand rugby union players
New Zealand sportspeople of Tongan descent
Canterbury rugby union players
Crusaders (rugby union) players
Highlanders (rugby union) players
Rugby union flankers
People from Lincoln, New Zealand
People educated at Christchurch Boys' High School
Living people
Edinburgh Rugby players
New Zealand expatriate rugby union players
New Zealand expatriate sportspeople in Scotland
Expatriate rugby union players in Scotland
Tonga international rugby union players
Moana Pasifika players
Benetton Rugby players
Otago rugby union players
Hino Red Dolphins players